Waigali is a language spoken by about 10,000 Nuristani people of the Waigal Valley in the Nuristan Province of Afghanistan. The native name is Kalaṣa-alâ 'Kalasha-language'.  "Waigali" refers to the dialect of the Väy people of the upper part of the Waigal Valley, centered on the town of Waigal, which is distinct from the dialect of the Čima-Nišei people who inhabit the lower valley.  The word 'Kalasha' is the native ethnonym for all the speakers of the southern Nuristani languages.

Kalaṣa-alâ belongs to the Indo-European language family, and is in the southern Nuristani group of the Indo-Iranian branch.  It is closely related to Zemiaki and to Tregami, the lexical similarity with the latter being approximately 76% to 80%.  

It shares its name with Kalaṣa-mun, spoken in Pakistan's southern Chitral District, but the two languages belong to different branches of Indo-Iranian. Waigali speakers are sometimes called “Red Kalasha,” while the speakers of the language in Pakistan are called “Black Kalasha.” According to linguist Richard Strand the Kalasha of Chitral apparently adopted the name of the Nuristani Kalasha, who at some unknown time had extended their influence into the region of southern Chitral.

Vocabulary 

Numbers:

 ev
 dū
 tre
 čatā
 pũč
 ṣu
 sot
 oṣṭ
 no
 doš

References

External links 
 
 
 
 

Nuristani languages of Afghanistan
Nuristani languages